The Gallic group is a dynamical grouping of the prograde irregular satellites of Saturn following similar orbits. Their semi-major axes range between 16 and 19 Gm, their inclinations between 35° and 40°, and their eccentricities around 0.53.

The International Astronomical Union (IAU) reserves names taken from Gallic mythology for these moons.

Similar mean orbital elements led the discoverers to postulate a common origin for the group in a breakup of a larger body. The group was later found to be physically homogeneous, all satellites displaying light-red colour (colour indices B − V = 0.91 and V − R = 0.48) and similar infrared indices 

Remarkably, recent observations revealed that the largest member of the group, Albiorix, displays actually two different colours: one compatible with Erriapus and Tarvos, and another less red. Instead of the common progenitor, it was postulated that Tarvos and Erriapus could be fragments of Albiorix, leaving a large, less red crater. Such an impact would require a body with the diameter in excess of 1 km and relative velocity close to 5 km/s, resulting in a large crater with the radius of 12 km. Numerous, very large craters observed on Phoebe, prove the existence of such collisions in the Saturnian system's past.

The discovery of 20 new moons of Saturn was announced in October 2019 by a team led by Scott S. Sheppard using the Subaru Telescope at Mauna Kea. One of them, S/2004 S 24, is also prograde, but it orbits much further away from Saturn than the four known Gallic moons. This moon will nevertheless also receive a name from Gallic mythology.

The four members of the group discovered before 2019 are (in order of increasing distance from Saturn):
Albiorix
Bebhionn
Erriapus
Tarvos

See also
 List of natural satellites

References

Ephemeris from MPC
Mean orbital parameters from JPL

External links
David Jewitt pages
Scott Sheppard pages

Gallic group
Moons of Saturn
Irregular satellites
Moons with a prograde orbit